Camille Jenatzy (1868, Schaerbeek – 8 December 1913, Habay la Neuve) was a Belgian race car driver. He is known for breaking the land speed record three times and being the first man to break the 100 km/h barrier.
He was nicknamed Le Diable Rouge ("The Red Devil") after the colour of his beard.

Record setting
That same day, the record was broken by Gaston de Chasseloup-Laubat, topped on 27 January 1899 when Jenatzy achieved . This record was again broken by Chasseloup-Laubat, who applied rudimentary streamlining to his Jeantaud. In 1902, he lost the land speed record to Léon Serpollet.

Jenatzy won the 1903 Gordon Bennet Cup in Athy, Ireland, at the wheel of a Mercedes. Auto racing was a deadly sport at the time and at some point Jenatzy predicted he would die in a Mercedes.

Death

Jenatzy died in 1913 in a hunting accident. He went behind a bush and made animal noises as a prank on his friends who were hunting with him. Alfred Madoux, director of the journal L'Etoile Belge,
fired, believing it was a wild animal. When they realised it was Jenatzy, they rushed him to hospital by car; he bled to death en route, fulfilling his own prophecy he would die in a Mercedes. He is buried at the Laeken Cemetery in Brussels.

References

1868 births
1913 deaths
Deaths by firearm in Belgium
People from Schaerbeek
Belgian racing drivers
Hunting accident deaths
Burials at Laeken Cemetery
Accidental deaths in Belgium
Firearm accident victims
Racing drivers from Brussels